London Central is a bus company operating in South London. It is a subsidiary of the Go-Ahead Group and operates services under contract to Transport for London.

History

London Central commenced operating on 1 April 1989 when London Buses was divided into 11 separate business units. In September 1994, it was sold to the Go-Ahead Group for £23.8 million. In August 2008, Go-Ahead's London bus operations all adopted the Go-Ahead London trading name, although the individual company names are still applied beneath the logo.

Garages
London Central operates five bus garages.

Bexleyheath (BX)
As at January 2023, Bexleyheath garage operated routes 51, 89, 132, 244, 321 (night service only on this 24-hour route), 486, 624, 625, 658, B11 B12, B13 and B16.

History
Built as a trolleybus depot by the London Passenger Transport Board, Bexleyheath was the only new garage built for trolleybuses. The depot is a large and imposing building, slightly set back from the main road to enable parking on the forecourt, which was used as a terminus for route 122. Bexleyheath closed in 1986, with work transferred to Catford, Plumstead and Sidcup garages.

In 1988 it re-opened under the guise of Bexleybus, a low-cost unit set up by London Buses under de-regulation, and had a large and varied allocation from Iveco/Robin Hoods and MCW Metroriders to Leyland Olympians and Daimler Fleetlines. The move to set up the new company to tender for routes backfired, and in the next round of tendering only route B16 was awarded to Bexleybus, whilst London Central won nine.

London Central took control of Bexleyheath garage and routes in 1990. Lately the garage has had a good utilisation figure, up to 139 in 2001 which necessitated parking in the rear yard and the forecourt. In January 2007, the garage received its first Alexander Dennis Enviro400s for use on route 486.

This garage also houses one of the companies iBus hubs, controlling routes for Bexleyheath, Morden Wharf, New Cross, and Peckham garages.

In 2022, Bexleyheath became the first bus garage in London to be equipped for 'opportunity charge' electric bus operation, whereby the bus is charged while terminating before starting its next journey. This was introduced on route 132 whose eastern terminus is at the garage. A gantry was installed at the garage connecting with a pantograph on the top of the bus. On 9 July 2022, a fleet of Alexander Dennis Enviro400EVs began to enter service on the route.

New Cross (NX)
As at December 2019, New Cross garage operated routes 21, 36, 108, 171, 172, 321 (day time service only), 343, 436, 453, N21, N89, N136, N171 and N343.

History
Said to be the largest of London's bus garages with space for over 300 buses, New Cross garage was originally a tram depot and opened in 1906. In 1952 with the trams withdrawn, the depot was converted into a bus garage. The garage has never been even close to its capacity due to the close proximity of other garages, but has at various times been used to store surplus vehicles.

The garage allocation has fluctuated over the years, from 191 in 1966 to 132 in 2001. The garage also houses some of the private hire fleet which is painted in the style of the former London General company. New Cross was also the garage for two special services, first in 1972 when it operated en ex Tilling ST on route 100 and LPG East Lancs Myllennium bodied DAF SB220s for Millennium Dome services M1 and M2. In 2003 the garage also began operating Mercedes-Benz Citaro articulated buses on route 436. In January 2005 route 36 ceased to be operated by AEC Routemasters with one man operated double deckers taking over.

Camberwell (Q)
As at July 2021, Camberwell garage operated routes 12, 35, 40, 42, 100, 176, 185, 188, 360, 484 and X68. On 30 April 2016, route 345 passed to Abellio London. On May 2, 2020, route P5 passed to Abellio with new Caetano eCity Gold Buses.

History
Although built in 1914, Camberwell garage was not used as a bus garage until 1919 as it had been requisitioned for the war effort. Once it came into use it was one of London's largest garages and also carried out body overhauls in 1940/41. The garage was bombed during World War II in 1940 with four buses being destroyed and 13 seriously damaged.

During the early 1950s the garage underwent modernisation with the welfare and operational block reconstructed and the parking area extended. The new building also incorporated a new pit and workshop layout in a separate self-contained block which also undertook heavy maintenance for the adjacent Walworth garage, 350 buses in all.

The allocation at Camberwell decreased slightly over the years from 165 in 1952 until the closure of Walworth garage in 1985 increased the allocation to 142. Camberwell was also the home of three Leyland Titans fitted with electronic blinds which were used on night bus standby duties.

New Routemasters were introduced on routes 12 and 68 between 2015 and 2016, and new Alexander Dennis Enviro200EVs were introduced on route 484 from 20 March 2021.

Peckham (PM)
As at May 2020, Peckham garage operated routes 37, 363, P12 and N1.

History
Peckham garage was converted from a local authority maintenance depot and opened in 1994 with a capacity for 75 buses. In 2000 the garage put London's first Alexander ALX400 bodied Volvo B7TL low-floor vehicles into service on 63. Peckham won bus garage of the year in 2004, although this turned out to be a poisoned chalice for the garage, losing almost half of its work in the next year's tender awards.

Morden Wharf (MG)
As of August 2021, Morden Wharf garage operated routes 1, 108, 129, 178, 225, 286, 291, 386, 469 and N1.

History
On 29 July 2017, Morden Wharf garage opened in North Greenwich after London General's Mandela Way garage closed, initially operating routes 108, 129, and 286.

Fleet
As at December 2019, London Central had a peak vehicle requirement of 676 buses.

References

External links

Company website

Go-Ahead Group London bus operators
1989 establishments in England